Arthur Fairchild Pearce (18 December 1903 – 6 March 1990) was a New Zealand clerk, jazz specialist, broadcaster and pianist. He was born in Wellington, New Zealand in 1903.

References

1903 births
1990 deaths
New Zealand jazz musicians
New Zealand pianists
People from Wellington City
New Zealand broadcasters
20th-century pianists